Port Alice  is a village of approximately 739 (2021 census) located on Neroutsos Inlet, southwest of Port McNeill, on Vancouver Island, originally built by Whalen Pulp and Paper Mills of Vancouver.  The community is known for its natural environment, pulp mill, and salt water fishing.

History
It was named after Alice Whalen, the founders' mother. The brothers Whalen began their construction of the mill at its present site in 1917, with first pulp produced in 1918. The mill at Swanson Bay, on the Inside Passage farther north, was also a Whalen operation. Port Alice bears a resemblance to Port Annie, the fictional town described by Vancouver Island author Jack Hodgins in his novel The Resurrection of Joseph Bourne. The new orchid hybrid "Port Alice" has been officially listed at London England in the Royal Horticultural Society's "Book of Registered Orchid Hybrids". This slipper-type flower is the result of crossing a complex hybrid Paphiopedilum "Western Sky" with a species Paphiopedilum appletonianum.

Geography

Devil’s Bath, a flooded sinkhole near Port Alice, is an example of a cenote and is the largest in Canada at 359 meters in diameter and 44 meters in depth.

There are a number of hiking destinations in the area. They include Devil’s Bath, Eternal Fountain, Vanishing River & Reappearing River. These are a series of ancient karst and limestone formations. The access is through dirt roads.

Climate

Demographics 

Notable people
Jason Bowen – NHL player 1992 - 1998 Between Philadelphia Flyers and Edmonton Oilers
Paul Manly – Green MP, and the son of the former NDP MP Jim Manly
Patrick Moore – founding member of Greenpeace
Dale Walters – 1984 Olympics bronze medalist in boxing
Daryl Sturdy - 1962 World Rowing Championships, eights 1962 British Empire and Commonwealth Games, eights 1963 Pan American Games, gold medal in eights, 1964 Tokyo Olympics, eights 1966 World Rowing Championships, coxless four 1967 Pan American Games,silver medal in pair, Royal Canadian Henley Regatta 1967 gold medal in junior singles, 1968 Mexico Olympics double

References

External links
 

Villages in British Columbia
Quatsino Sound region
Populated places in the Regional District of Mount Waddington